Acamantis was one of the phylai (tribes) of classical Athens, created during the reforms of Cleisthenes. It was named after the legendary hero Acamas, and included the demes of 
Cholargos,
Eiresidai,
Hermos,
Iphistiadai,
Kerameis,
Kephale,
Poros,
Thorikos,
Eitea,
Hagnous,
Kikynna,
Prospalta and
Sphettos.

Pericles was a member of this tribe.

Notes

References 

Tribes of ancient Attica